Pauline Julien,  (May 23, 1928October 1, 1998), nicknamed "La Renarde", was a singer, songwriter, actress, feminist activist and Quebec sovereigntist.

Born in Trois-Rivières, Quebec, Julien was the companion of the poet and Québec provincial MLA Gérald Godin, another Trifluvian and sovereignist. Julien performed pro-independence songs in Montréal clubs as early as 1964. In 1965 she hosted the CBC television series Mon pays, mes chansons. At the CBC she also collaborated and recorded with pianist Herbert Ruff, and performed on the program On Stage.

In 1970, Julien and Godin were arrested during the October Crisis and were released eight days later without charge.

In 1994, France decorated her with the title Chevalier des Arts et des Lettres. Julien was made a Chevalière de l'Ordre national du Québec.

Diagnosed with a debilitating brain disease, Julien committed suicide in early October 1998 in Montreal.

She was the subject of the 2018 documentary film Pauline Julien, Intimate and Political (Pauline Julien, intime et politique).

Discography 
 1962 - Enfin Pauline Julien
 1963 - Pauline Julien
 1964 - Pauline Julien à la Comédie canadienne
 1965 – Pauline Julien chante Raymond Levesque
 1966 – Pauline Julien chante Boris Vian
 1967 – Suite québécoise
 1969 – Comme je crie… comme je chante… (textes de Gilbert Langevin)
 1971 – Fragile
 1972 – Au milieu de ma vie, peut-être la veille de....
 1973 – Aller voir, vous avez des ailes
 1974 – Licence complète
 1975 – En scène
 1976 – Tout ou rien (Récital Brecht)
 1978 – Les 7 péchés capitaux
 1978 – Femmes de paroles
 1979 – Mes amies d'filles (Kebec Disc KD-949)
 1980 – Fleur de peau
 1984 – Où peut-on vous toucher ?
 1993 – Pauline Julien (Collection Québec Love)
 1996 – Pauline Julien
 1997 – Brecht & Weill
 1998 – Au temps des boîtes à chansons
 1998 – Les années de la Butte à Mathieu

Movies 
 1964 : Fabienne sans son Jules
 1964 : La Terre à boire : Diane
 1967 : Entre la mer et l'eau douce : Elle-même
 1971 : La Nuit de la poésie 27 mars 1970
 1973 : La Mort d'un bûcheron : Charlotte Juillet
 1974 : Bulldozer : Mignonne Galarneau

See also

List of Quebec musicians
List of Mauriciens
Music of Quebec
 Gérald Godin

References

External links
 Hommage à Pauline Julien sur Lycos
 Fiche de Pauline Julien dans Québec info Musique
 

1928 births
1998 suicides
French Quebecers
Songwriters from Quebec
Singers from Quebec
French-language singers of Canada
Knights of the National Order of Quebec
Canadian women singer-songwriters
Canadian stage actresses
Musicians from Trois-Rivières
Suicides in Quebec
October Crisis
Canadian feminists
Quebec sovereigntists
20th-century Canadian actresses
Feminist musicians
Canadian women's rights activists
Columbia Records artists
20th-century Canadian women singers